Joe or Joseph O'Donnell may refer to:

 Joe O'Donnell (photojournalist) (1922–2007), American documentarian, photojournalist and photographer
 Joe O'Donnell (American football) (1941–2019), offensive lineman
 Joe O'Donnell (musician) (born 1948), Celtic rock violinist
 Joe O'Donnell (footballer) (born 1961), Scottish footballer
 Joseph O'Donnell Sr. (1722–1787), Spanish general and father of Joseph O'Donnell the younger and two other generals of the Napoleonic Wars
 Joseph O'Donnell (younger) (1768–1836), Spanish general of the Napoleonic Wars
 Joseph O'Donnell Jr. (1925–2005), Lieutenant Governor of the U.S. State of Rhode Island
 Joseph O'Donnell (screenwriter) (1891–1963), American screenwriter